Dr Rajan Sushant is an Indian politician and  a member of Aam Aadmi Party. In the 2009 election he was elected to the Lok Sabha from the Kangra constituency in Himachal Pradesh on BJP ticket. He is a former member of Bhartiya Janata Party.

Political career 
Sushant is generally referred to as an honest firebrand politician due to the open criticism of his own party and government at various events in time.  
He was suspended from  Bharatiya Janata Party (BJP) in April 2011 on anti-party activities after he had raised serious corruption charges within the party. He left BJP few months before 2014.

Member of Legislative Assembly
Sushant emerged from the Emergency period churning after being in jail for months during his student days opposing emergency. He was elected as the youngest member of the H.P legislative assembly in 1982. He is a five-time member of the assembly and was Minister in BJP government from 1998 to 2003. He has led many agitations and movements, prominent being Shah Nahar, Daily Wagers and Nurpur College. He has been jailed by the various governments for years consequent to various public agitations and protests.

Many land reforms were also introduced during his tenure as Revenue Minister, major being translation of rules from Urdu to Hindi and English, issuing Kisan Pass Books and digitization of land records, etc.

Member of Parliament 
In the 2009 election he was elected to the Lok Sabha from the Kangra constituency in Himachal Pradesh on BJP ticket.

Aam Aadmi Party 
He had joined Anna Andolan and later joined AAP from where he contested the 2014 Lok Sabha election only to secure the third position in the Kangra-Chamba constituency. He then became active in a social organization.

In 2016 he quit AAP and founded a new party named Himachal Party Himachal Regional Alliance.

Since 2022, he is a member of Aam Aadmi Party. He is AAP candidate from Fatehpur, Himachal Pradesh Assembly constituency for the 2022 Himachal Pradesh Legislative Assembly election. His name was released in the first list of 4 candidates on 20 September 2022.

References

External links
Official biographical sketch in Parliament of India website

India MPs 2009–2014
Living people
1955 births
Lok Sabha members from Himachal Pradesh
Aam Aadmi Party candidates in the 2014 Indian general election
Former members of Bharatiya Janata Party from Himachal Pradesh
Aam Aadmi Party politicians